The Polje District, or simply Polje, is a district of the City Municipality of Ljubljana, the capital of Slovenia. It is named after the former village of Polje.

Geography
The Polje District is bounded on the west by the A1 Freeway, on the north by the Sava River, and on the east and south by the Ljubljanica River. The district includes the former villages of Polje, Slape, Spodnja Zadobrova, Spodnji Kašelj, Vevče, Zalog, Zgornja Zadobrova, and Zgornji Kašelj.

References

External links
Polje District on Geopedia
Polje District homepage

 
Districts of Ljubljana